Berberis rawatii is a shrub in the family Berberidaceae. It is known only from the Chamoli and Pithoragarh districts of Uttarakhand in northern India.

References

rawatii
Flora of West Himalaya
Plants described in 2011